In geometry, a pentagonal pyramid is a pyramid with a pentagonal base upon which are erected five triangular faces that meet at a point (the apex). Like any pyramid, it is self-dual.

The regular pentagonal pyramid has a base that is a regular pentagon and lateral faces that are equilateral triangles. It is one of the Johnson solids.

It can be seen as the "lid" of an icosahedron; the rest of the icosahedron forms a gyroelongated pentagonal pyramid, 

More generally an order-2 vertex-uniform pentagonal pyramid can be defined with a regular pentagonal base and 5 isosceles triangle sides of any height.

Cartesian coordinates 
The pentagonal pyramid can be seen as the "lid" of a regular icosahedron; the rest of the icosahedron forms a gyroelongated pentagonal pyramid, J11. From the Cartesian coordinates of the icosahedron, Cartesian coordinates for a pentagonal pyramid with edge length 2 may be inferred as

where  (sometimes written as φ) is the golden ratio.

The height H, from the midpoint of the pentagonal face to the apex, of a pentagonal pyramid with edge length a may therefore be computed as:

Its surface area A can be computed as the area of the pentagonal base plus five times the area of one triangle:

Its volume can be calculated as:

Related polyhedra 
The pentagrammic star pyramid has the same vertex arrangement, but connected onto a pentagram base:

Example

References

External links 
 
Virtual Reality Polyhedra www.georgehart.com: The Encyclopedia of Polyhedra ( VRML model)

Pyramids and bipyramids
Self-dual polyhedra
Prismatoid polyhedra
Johnson solids